"Ride With Me" is a song by rock band Steppenwolf featured on their album For Ladies Only. It was originally performed by Mars Bonfire on his self-titled album with a length over six minutes and under the title "Ride With Me, Baby". The song peaked at 52 on The Billboard Hot 100.

Cover versions
The tune was covered by The Alice Cooper Band and appeared in the film Diary of a Mad Housewife.

References

Steppenwolf (band) songs
1971 singles
1971 songs
MCA Records singles